Kazumi is a Japanese given name that can be given to either sex.

Possible writings
和美, "peace, beauty"
一巳, "one, sign of the snake"
一美, "one, beauty"
一実, "one, truth"
和海, "peace, sea"
数魅, "number, fascination"
数巳, "number, sign of the snake"
和満, "peace, satisfy, full"
The name Kazumi can be written with kanji characters (as listed above), or it can be written using the katakana and hiragana writing systems. In hiragana, Kazumi is written as かずみ, while in katakana, it is written as カズミ.

People with the given name
, Japanese bobsledder
Kazumi Akedo (明戸 和巳), Japanese Go player
Kazumi Fujita (藤田 一巳), Japanese mecha designer
, Japanese politician
Kazumi Kazui (一井 かずみ), Japanese manga artist
Kazumi Kishimoto (岸本 一美), Japanese figure skater
Kazumi Kurigami (操上 和美), Japanese photographer
Kazumi Matsuo (松尾 和美), Japanese marathon runner
, Japanese volleyball player
Kazumi Onishi (大西 一美), Japanese figure skater
Kazumi Ota (太田 和美), Japanese politician
Kazumi Saito (斉藤 和巳), Japanese baseball player 
Kazumi Sekine (関根 和美),  Japanese film director, producer and dramatist
Kazumi Tabata (田畑 和美), Japanese karateka
Kazumi Takahashi (高橋 和巳, 1931-1971), Japanese writer and scholar of Chinese literature
Kazumi Takayama (高山一実), Japanese idol and writer
Kazumi Totaka (戸高 一生), Japanese video game composer and voice actor
Kazumi Watanabe (渡辺香津美), Japanese jazz and jazz fusion guitarist
, Japanese long-distance runner
, Japanese sport shooter
Kazumi Yamashita (manga artist) (山下 和美), Japanese manga artist
, Japanese screenwriter and novelist

Fictional characters
Kazumi Akiyama (秋山 和美), a character from the manga series Initial D.
Kazumi Amano (アマノ・カズミ), a character from the OVA series Gunbuster.
Kazumi Asakura (朝倉 和美), a character from the Negima! Magister Negi Magi manga series and its anime adaption.
Kazumi Iwase, one of the main characters from the visual novel Memo.
Kazumi Kato, a character from the webcomic series The Order of the Stick.
Kazumi, the main character from the spinoff manga of Puella Magi Madoka Magica, Puella Magi Kazumi Magica.
Kazumi Mishima, a character from the Tekken series.
Kazumi Sawatari, a character from Kamen Rider Build
Kazumi Satou, character from Mayoi Neko Overrun!.
Kazumi Yokokawa, from Strike Witches.
Kazumi Yoshida, main character from the Shakugan no Shana series.
Kazumi Yoshinaga, main character from the light novel series Gargoyle of Yoshinaga House.
Kazumi Yukihira (行平 一己), a side character from the manga series Gakuen Alice.
Kazumi Schlierenzauer, a character from the manga Brynhildr in the Darkness.
Kazumi Mishima (三島 和己), a character from the game Your Turn To Die.
Kazumi Alex * (行平 一己), a character from irl   Alex M. Gavriloae

References

See also
Kasumi (disambiguation)

Japanese unisex given names